The Monteverdi Hai 650 F1 was a prototype Swiss sports car concept produced by Monteverdi in the 1990s.

History

In 1992 Peter Monteverdi decided to re-enter the automobile industry. To achieve that he needed something stunning and capturing to cause a stir, such as the Monteverdi Hai 450 SS did back in 1970. The target was to create the ultimate supercar, and a true F1 car for the road. To accomplish that, the company used a Formula 1 chassis from the defunct Monteverdi - Onyx F1 team plus its engine. The car itself was built around a F1 chassis utilizing a Ford DFR V8 F1 engine, though in detuned form. The car was named Hai 650 F1, paying homage to its lineage started with the Hai 450 SS of 1970 and denoting the car's power output and F1 pedigree. The car was shown to several potential customers and a few orders were taken, although no cars seem to have been sold to customers. Three prototypes were built, one of which is currently on display in the Swiss National Transport Museum in Luzern, Switzerland.

Technical specifications
Engine

Engine: Ford DFR V8
Engine Capacity: 3491 c.c (3.5 litres)
Power Output:  at 11,000 rpm

Transmission

Transmission: Six speed manual gearbox

Performance

Top speed: 208 mph (claimed)
Acceleration: 0-60 mph 3.0 seconds (claimed)

References
 Monteverdi Hai 650 F1 at Supercars.net
 Technical specifications at CarsPlusPlus.com

External links

Photographs, history and general information of Monteverdi cars

Monteverdi vehicles

Rear mid-engine, rear-wheel-drive vehicles
1990s cars